To the Starry Island is a 1993 South Korean film directed by Park Kwang-su.

Plot
According to his father's wishes, Moon Jae-Goo attempts to bury his father's body on the island on which he was born. Because of bitter memories of his father's political past during wartime, the villagers refuse to allow his burial. Kim Cheol, Moon's poet friend, attempts to persuade the villagers to change their minds while Moon recalls his past life on the island and his relationships with four local women.

Cast
Ahn Sung-ki as Kim Cheol
Moon Sung-keun as Moon Jae-Goo
Shim Hye-jin as Oknimi
Ahn So-young as Bulttoknyo
Lee Yong-yi as Upsoonne
Kim Yong-man 
Heo Joon-ho
Kim Il-woo 
Min Kyoung-jin 
Park Bu-yang

Reception
To the Starry Island had received a positive review from Time Out, which called the film "fascinating, with a bold, shocking climax".

Awards
Three Continents Festival (1994): Audience Award

Bibliography

References

External links

1990s Korean-language films
South Korean fantasy drama films
Films directed by Park Kwang-su